Michel Dovaz (born August 14, 1928 in Geneva, Switzerland) is a Swiss wine critic and food writer. He started his career as a journalist in Paris, France and later taught wine courses at the Academie du Vin in Paris when he served as a judge at the Paris Wine Tasting of 1976. He subsequently wrote several books on French wine as well as the chapter on Champagne for the Guide Hachette des Vins.

Car collections
Less well known is the fact, that Dovaz was the owner of a collection of 50+ unrestored oldtimers, which he stored on his estate south of Paris up to 1984. The collection consisted of prewar and postwar cars of the most luxurious brands (nine Bugatti, nine Lancia, four Alfa Romeo, four Lincoln, two Ferrari, two Lotus, two Rolls-Royce, two Bentley...). The collection became famous when a German photographer was allowed to take photos of the neglected cars in 1983 in the savaged garden south of Paris. Most of the cars have been sold since then and many have been restored, but some are still asleep.

Two books have been written about the Dovaz car collection. The first was 'Sleeping Beauties' (1986/2007/2013) which showed the collection in its dilapidated 'as found' state. The book brought unwanted attention to the Dovaz collection. The second book 'The Fate of the Sleeping Beauties' (published in 2008 in Dutch, 2009 in English, 2011 in French and 2015 in German) gives additional information about Michel Dovaz and how the collection came to be. In addition the book tells the story of what happened to the collection and the single cars.

See also
List of wine personalities

Further reading

References

External links
New Book - The Fate of the Sleeping Beauties
Collection Dovaz - The Fate of the Sleeping Beauties
Sleeping Beauties

Living people
Food writers
Wine critics
1928 births
Male non-fiction writers